Pisarevka is a rural locality (a selo) and the administrative center of Pisarevskoye Rural Settlement, Kantemirovsky District, Voronezh Oblast, Russia. The population was 1,658 as of 2010. There are 15 streets.

Geography 
Pisarevka is located 35 km northeast of Kantemirovka (the district's administrative centre) by road. Taly is the nearest rural locality.

References 

Rural localities in Kantemirovsky District